Events in the year 1896 in Portugal.

Incumbents
Monarch: Carlos I 
President of the Council of Ministers: Ernesto Hintze Ribeiro

Births
 23 March - José Balbino da Silva, footballer (deceased)
 12 April - Vítor Cândido Gonçalves, footballer (died 1965)
 19 July - António Ribeiro dos Reis, footballer, journalist (died 1961)
 24 September - Cândido de Oliveira, football player, coach, sports journalist (died 1958)
 19 October - Domingos de Sousa, horse rider (died 1984)
 22 October - José Leitão de Barros, film director, playwright (died 1967)
 16 December - Armindo Monteiro, university professor, businessman, diplomat, politician (died 1955)
 Joaquim Filipe dos Santos, footballer (deceased)

Deaths
 11 January - João de Deus, poet (born 1830)
 26 March - Antonia Ferreira, businesswoman (born 1811).

See also
List of colonial governors in 1896#Portugal

References

 
1890s in Portugal
Years of the 19th century in Portugal
Portugal